Earl Allen Kelley (December 24, 1932 – August 13, 2016) was an American basketball player who competed in the 1960 Summer Olympics.

Born in Dearing, Kansas, he was part of the American basketball team, which won the gold medal in 1960. Kelley died at the age of 83 on August 13, 2016 in Lawrence, Kansas.

He was the brother of 1952 Summer Olympics gold medalist Dean Kelley.

References

External links

basketpedya.com

1932 births
2016 deaths
American men's basketball players
Basketball players at the 1960 Summer Olympics
Basketball players from Kansas
FIBA World Championship-winning players
Kansas Jayhawks men's basketball players
Medalists at the 1960 Summer Olympics
Milwaukee Hawks draft picks
Olympic gold medalists for the United States in basketball
People from Crawford County, Kansas
People from Montgomery County, Kansas
Peoria Caterpillars players
United States men's national basketball team players
Guards (basketball)
1954 FIBA World Championship players